Mario Coppola (born 7 August 1990) is an Italian professional footballer who plays as a midfielder for  club Vis Pesaro.

Career
Born in Aversa, Coppola started his career in Bologna and Lazio youth sector. As a senior, he made his debut in 2010–11 Lega Pro Seconda Divisione with Pomezia.

On 30 September 2015, he joined to Pro Patria in Serie C.

The next season, on 8 July 2016 he moved to Serie D side Nocerina.

He played one year for Nocerina, and in December 2017 joined to Potenza, also in Serie D. He played four seasons for the club, winning the promotion on his first year, and he also was a captain.

On 23 July 2021, he signed with Vis Pesaro.

References

External links
 
 

1990 births
Living people
People from Aversa
Footballers from Campania
Italian footballers
Association football midfielders
Serie C players
Lega Pro Seconda Divisione players
Serie D players
Bologna F.C. 1909 players
S.S. Lazio players
A.S.D. Portogruaro players
A.S.D. Sorrento players
S.S. Arezzo players
Aurora Pro Patria 1919 players
A.S.D. Nocerina 1910 players
Potenza Calcio players
Vis Pesaro dal 1898 players
Sportspeople from the Province of Caserta